Kiattipong Radchatagriengkai (RTGS: Kiattiphong Ratchatakriangkrai, born July 17, 1966 in Nakhon Ratchasima), popularly known as  Coach Aod, was the head coach of the Thailand women's national volleyball team. He got bachelor's degree from Kasetsart University

He was a member of Thailand men's national volleyball team and, following retirement from playing, became a staff coach in Thailand's national volleyball team. Coach Aod learn how to coach volleyball from a Chinese coach before becoming a head coach. In December 2014 he married Feng Kun. In 2016, Coach Aod decided to end his tenure as national team coach to spend more time with his family.

Awards

Individuals 
 2012 Siamsport Award "Amateur Athletic trainers excellent"

Career

As a coach

Royal decorations 
 2013 -  Commander (Third Class) of The Most Exalted Order of the White Elephant
 2010 -  Companion (Fourth Class) of The Most Admirable Order of the Direkgunabhorn

References

External links

1966 births
Kiattipong Radchatagriengkai
Kiattipong Radchatagriengkai
National team coaches
Living people
Volleyball coaches
Kiattipong Radchatagriengkai
Thai autobiographers
Kiattipong Radchatagriengkai